Nasi padang, sometimes referred to as Padang rice, is a Minangkabau dish of steamed rice served with various choices of pre-cooked dishes originating from West Sumatra, Indonesia. It is named after the city of Padang, capital of the West Sumatra province. A miniature banquet of meats, fish, vegetables, and spicy sambals eaten with plain white rice, it is Sumatra's most famous export and the Minangkabau people's primary contribution to Indonesian cuisine.

A Padang restaurant is usually easily distinguishable with its Rumah Gadang-style facade and typical window display. Such displays usually consist of stages and rows of carefully arranged stacked bowls and plates filled with various dishes. Padang restaurants, especially smaller ones, will usually bear names in the Minang language.

Nasi padang is a vital part of the Indonesian workers' lunch break in urban areas. When nasi padang prices in the Greater Jakarta area were raised in 2016, municipal civil servants demanded the uang lauk pauk (food allowance, a component of civil servants' salary) to be raised as well.

Nasi padang is found in various cities in Sumatra, Java, Kalimantan, Sulawesi, Nusa Tenggara, and Papua as well as neighboring countries Malaysia, Singapore, and Australia.

Serving
In Padang restaurants, there are two methods of serving: pesan (ordering) and hidang (serve) method.

Pesan, the most common method, usually employed by small restaurants with one or two customers ordering at a time, involves the customer examining the window display and choosing each desired dish, ordering directly from the attendant. 

In larger restaurants, the festive hidang method is usually employed. This mini banquet is most suitable for dining in a group. After being seated, patrons are served (without prompt) a set of dishes by waiters whose arms are stacked with plates. The dishes, usually numbering a dozen, typically includes beef rendang, curried fish, stewed greens, chili eggplant, curried beef liver, tripe, intestines or foot tendons, fried beef lung, fried chicken, and sambal, the spicy sauces ubiquitous at Indonesian tables.

Nasi padang served this way is akin to an at-your-table, by-the-plate buffet. Customers only pay for what they have consumed from this array.

In Minang food establishments, it is common to eat with one's hands. Kobokan, a bowl of tap water with a slice of lime, is provided for washing hands before and after eating. If a customer does not wish to eat with bare hands, it is acceptable to ask for a spoon and fork.

Dishes

Steamed rice is usually served with gulai cubadak (unripe jackfruit gulai) and boiled cassava leaves. Nasi padang dishes are quite similar to nasi kapau from Bukittinggi. The differences mainly lie in the method of serving. Dishes offered include:

 Gulai cubadak, unripe jackfruit gulai
 Sayur daun ubi kayu or sayur daun singkong, boiled cassava leaves
 Rendang, chunks of beef stewed in spicy coconut milk and chili gravy, cooked well until dried. Other than beef, rendang ayam (chicken rendang) and rendang itik (duck rendang) can be found
 Daun ubi tumbuk, cassava leaves in coconut milk
 Kalio, similar to rendang; while rendang is rather dry, kalio is watery and light-colored
 Gulai ayam, chicken gulai
 Gulai cancang, gulai of meats and cow internal organs
 Gulai tunjang, gulai of cow foot tendons
 Gulai babek, gulai babat or gulai paruik kabau, gulai of cow tripes
 Gulai iso or gulai usus, gulai of cow intestines usually filled with eggs and tofu
 Gulai limpo, gulai of cow spleen
 Gulai ati, gulai of cow liver
 Gulai otak, gulai of cow brain
 Gulai sumsum, gulai of cow bone marrow
 Gulai gajeboh, cow fat gulai
 Gulai itiak, duck gulai
 Gulai talua''', boiled eggs gulai
 Gulai kepala ikan kakap merah, red snapper's head gulai
 Gulai jariang, jengkol stinky bean gulai
 Dendeng batokok, thin crispy beef
 Dendeng balado, thin crispy beef with chili
 Paru goreng, fried cow lung
 Ayam bakar, grilled spicy chicken
 Ayam balado, chicken in chili
 Ayam goreng, fried chicken with spicy granules
 Ayam lado ijo, chicken in green chili
 Ayam pop, Minang-style chicken, boiled/steamed and then fried
 Ikan bilih, fried small freshwater fish of the genus Mystacoleucus
 Baluik goreng, crispy fried small freshwater eel
 Udang balado, shrimp in chili
 Rajungan goreng, crispy fried crab
 Terong balado, eggplant in chili
 Petai goreng, fried green stinky bean (Parkia speciosa)
 Ikan asam padeh, fish with spicy-sour taste
 Itiak lado mudo''', duck in green chili
 Peyek udang, shrimp rempeyek Kerupuk jangek, cow's skin krupuk Sambal balado, sambal with large sliced chilli pepper
 Sambal lado tanak
 Lele goreng, fried catfish

In popular culture
 In 2016, Norwegian singer Audun Kvitland Røstad created an ode for Padang rice to describe his love for this food. The music video subsequently went viral.

See also

 Indonesian cuisine
 List of rice dishes
 Nasi kapau
 Nasi campur
 Nasi uduk
 Nasi ulam
 Padang cuisine

References

Padang cuisine
Indonesian rice dishes
Rice dishes